The 2021–22 NBL season was the 44th season of the National Basketball League since its establishment in 1979. A total of ten teams are contesting in the 2021–22 season, which commenced on 3 December 2021.

Australian broadcast rights to the season are held by ESPN in the first season of a new three-year deal. All games are available live on ESPN and the streaming platform Kayo Sports. After signing onto the new three-year deal, Network 10 will broadcast two Sunday afternoon games on 10 Peach and 10 Play. In New Zealand, Sky Sport continue as the official league broadcaster, with Dongqiudi, TAP Sports, M Plus, Astro, Fanseat, Spring Media, Live Now and YouTube broadcasting games internationally.

Teams

Stadiums and locations 

Ten teams are competing in the 2021–22 season, with the Tasmania JackJumpers entering the league for their first season.

Personnel and sponsorship

Player transactions 

Free agency negotiations were delayed until 28 June 2021, due to the late finish of the 2020–21 season which had been delayed due to COVID-19 pandemic.

Coaching transactions

Pre-season 

The pre-season consisted of warm-up games leading up to the start of the regular season, with the NBL Blitz tournament running during this period. The NBL Blitz ran from 13 to 28 November with all ten teams competing, and was hosted throughout Tasmania, Victoria and New South Wales.

Ladder

NBL Blitz ladder

Regular season 

The regular season began on 3 December 2021. It consisted of 140 games spread across 21 rounds, with the final game being played on 24 April 2022. 

On 24 April 2022, Melbourne United claimed their 6th regular season championship.

Ladder 

The NBL tie-breaker system as outlined in the NBL Rules and Regulations states that in the case of an identical win–loss record, the overall points percentage will determine order of seeding.

Finals 

The 2022 NBL Finals were played in April and May 2022, consisting of two best-of-three semi-final series and a best-of-five Grand Final series. In the semi-finals, the higher seed hosted the first and third games. In the Grand Final, the higher seed hosts the first, third and fifth games.

Playoff bracket

Awards

Pre-season
 Loggins-Bruton Cup: Adelaide 36ers
 Most Valuable Player (Ray Borner Medal): Mitch McCarron (Adelaide 36ers)

Regular season

Awards Night
 Most Valuable Player (Andrew Gaze Trophy): Jaylen Adams (Sydney Kings)
 Rookie of the Year: Bul Kuol (Cairns Taipans)
 Best Defensive Player (Damian Martin Trophy): Antonius Cleveland (Illawarra Hawks)
 Best Sixth Man: Shea Ili (Melbourne United)
 Most Improved Player: Keanu Pinder (Cairns Taipans)
 Fans MVP: Kai Sotto (Adelaide 36ers)
 Coach of the Year (Lindsay Gaze Trophy): Scott Roth (Tasmania JackJumpers)
 Executive of the Year: Simon Edwards (New Zealand Breakers)
 Referee of the Year: Vaughan Mayberry
 GameTime by Kmart: Jack McVeigh (Tasmania JackJumpers)
 All-NBL First Team: 
 Bryce Cotton (Perth Wildcats)
 Jaylen Adams (Sydney Kings)
 Antonius Cleveland (Illawarra Hawks)
 Vic Law (Perth Wildcats)
 Jo Lual-Acuil (Melbourne United)
 All-NBL Second Team: 
 Matthew Dellavedova (Melbourne United)
 Josh Adams (Tasmania JackJumpers)
 Chris Goulding (Melbourne United)
 Mitch Creek (S.E. Melbourne Phoenix)
 Xavier Cooks (Sydney Kings)

Post Season

 Grand Final Series MVP (Larry Sengstock Medal): Xavier Cooks (Sydney Kings)
 NBL Chamipons: Sydney Kings

References

External links

 
Australia, NBL
2021–22 in Australian basketball
2021 in New Zealand basketball
2022 in New Zealand basketball